Aotine betaherpesvirus 1 (AoHV-1) is a species of virus in the genus Cytomegalovirus, subfamily Betaherpesvirinae, family Herpesviridae, and order Herpesvirales.

Night monkeys (Aotus spp.) serve as natural hosts.

References

External links
 

Betaherpesvirinae